Écourt-Saint-Quentin is a commune in the Pas-de-Calais department in the Hauts-de-France region of France.

Geography

Population

Places of interest
 The church of St.Quentin, dating from the twentieth century.
 Traces of a Merovingian cemetery and an old castle.
 Evidence of Roman settlement.
 An old flour mill.

See also
Communes of the Pas-de-Calais department

References

Ecourtsaintquentin